Sine is an unincorporated community in Grays Harbor County, in the U.S. state of Washington.

History
A post office called Sine was established in 1905, and remained in operation until 1910. The community has the name of Jackson Sine, an early settler.

References

Unincorporated communities in Grays Harbor County, Washington
Unincorporated communities in Washington (state)